Dark Mirage (March 6, 1965 – July 9, 1969) was an American Hall of Fame Champion Thoroughbred racehorse.

Racing career
Dark Mirage was 15.1 hands high. In her 1967 campaign as a two-year-old, she had two minor wins in fifteen starts. As a three-year-old, she lost her first race, then (en route to winning nine in a row) became the first winner of the Filly Triple Crown, capturing all three races with ease. Her handlers decided to rest her for the remainder of the racing season. Dark Mirage's performance earned her the American Champion Three-Year-Old Filly honor.

At age four, Dark Mirage raced only two times. She won her first race and, in the next, severely injured a fetlock joint. This injury ended her racing career and resulted in her death a few months later.

Hall of fame
In 1974, Dark Mirage was inducted into the United States' National Museum of Racing and Hall of Fame.

Pedigree

References

External links
 Dark Mirage at the United States' National Museum of Racing and Hall of Fame

1965 racehorse births
1969 racehorse deaths
Horses who died from racing injuries
Racehorses bred in Kentucky
Racehorses trained in the United States
Triple Crown of Thoroughbred Racing winners
Eclipse Award winners
United States Thoroughbred Racing Hall of Fame inductees
Kentucky Oaks winners
Thoroughbred family 9-b